Cola clavata is a species of flowering plant in the family Malvaceae. It is found only in Mozambique.

It is found in coastal forests of Zambezia and Sofala provinces of central Mozambique.

It is affected by habitat loss from the destruction of its native forests by human-caused fires and conversion to agriculture. Only small patches of undisturbed forest remain.

References

clavata
Endemic flora of Mozambique
Southern Zanzibar–Inhambane coastal forest mosaic
Plants described in 1868
Taxonomy articles created by Polbot